Dawid Moryc Apfelbaum (some sources give Mieczysław or Mordechaj as his second name, and Appelbaum as his surname), nom de guerre "Kowal" ("Blacksmith") (?-4/28/1943) was allegedly an officer in the Polish Army and a commander of the Jewish Military Union (Żydowski Związek Wojskowy, ŻZW), during the Warsaw Ghetto Uprising. His very existence has been questioned by some historians, who argue that there is no credible evidence to suggest that there was a person by that name involved in the ŻZW in any capacity.

Biography
In 1939 Apfelbaum was a Lieutenant in the Polish Army. During the German invasion of Poland he fought in the defence of the Polish capital Warsaw.

After Poland's defeat together with many other Jews in Polish Army as well as Polish-Jewish political leaders he founded the ŻZW. In structures of the organization, Apfelbaum purportedly was the chief of the department of communication with Korpus Bezpieczeństwa and Armia Krajowa on "Aryan" site of Warsaw. Together with Paweł Frenkiel he was also said to be a leader of the war department in ŻZW. In the meantime, Armia Krajowa secured his promotion to Captain from the Polish government in exile.

It is stated in many secondary accounts that during the Warsaw Ghetto Uprising Captain Apfelbaum was commander of a squad who took part in the heavy fighting in defense of the Muranowski Square. He was supposedly killed in the first days of uprising.

After his death he was promoted to the rank of Major in the Polish Army by the AK command. In 2004, the mayor of Warsaw Lech Kaczyński had a square named for Apfelbaum in the city's Wola district.

Moshe Arens, the author of numerous works on the Revisionist underground in the Warsaw Ghetto Uprising maintains that the "ZZW was led by Pawel Frenkel, a member of the Revisionist Youth Movement, Betar; Leon Rodal, a member of the Revisionist movement, and David Apfelbaum, a former officer in the Polish Army who was an adherent of Zeev Jabotinsky."

Doubts about the existence of Apfelbaum
According to the historians Dariusz Libionka and Laurence Weinbaum, authors of an extensive study of the ŻZW, Apfelbaum was in all likelihood an entirely  mythical figure. In an article published in 2007 in the Israeli newspaper Haaretz, and the Polish journal Więź they maintain that there is no credible evidence to suggest that there was a person by that name involved in the ZZW in any capacity. They reject the writings of Arens and others (including most notably Paris author Marian Apfelbaum) who ascribe to Apfelbaum a leadership role in the ŻZW. Libionka and Weinbaum demonstrate that Apfelbaum's name does not appear in any reliable eyewitness testimony and that contrary to claims to the contrary, Dawid Wdowiński did not refer to him in his memoirs. Libionka and Weinbaum examine the provenance of the Apfelbaum story and trace it to  the accounts of Henryk Iwański and his cohorts. In their book, published in 2011, that testimony is deconstructed and relegated to the category of "apocrypha."

See also
Dawid Wdowiński

References

Further reading
Chaim Lazar, Matsada shel Varsha (Tel Aviv: Machon Jabotinsky, 1963).
(English) David Wdowiński, And we are not saved. (New York: Philosophical Library,1963).

External links
 
A legendary commander Apfelbaum
Apfelbaum

1943 deaths
Jewish Military Union members
Jewish resistance members during the Holocaust
People who died in the Warsaw Ghetto
People whose existence is disputed
Polish Army officers
Polish military personnel killed in World War II
Resistance members killed by Nazi Germany
Year of birth unknown